The Last Drive is a Greek punk garage rock group, which was formed in 1983, broke up in 1995, and reunited in January 2007.

History

1983-1987: The beginnings
The Last Drive started playing under the name "Last Drive" in late 1983 and their first performance was at the "Rodeo club" on December 27th, 1983. They adopted the name "Last Drive" after noticing a cocktail by that name at a bar menu. During 1984, Yiorgos Karanikolas was added on lead guitar. The group was basically playing garage rock mixed with rockabilly and surf rock. They started playing in underground joints of that time, while some band members played with Blue Light (group) at their first live performance at Pegasus club. In 1985 they released their first record, the 7" single Midnite Hop, which now is the most sought-after record by collectors in Greece. They also participated with a song in a compilation tape by Dikaioma Diavasis records, Live at the Kyttaro club. In 1986 they released their full-length LP album Underworld Shakedown. The content and the quality of production (by the Drive themselves) was considered unusually high for the standards of the independent scene of that time. The LP contained covers of garage standards such as Misirlou and Night of the phantom, as well as their own material.

1987-1990: Europe
They continued to appear live in Athens and many other cities in Greece, and in the spring of 1987 they toured abroad for the first time, in Germany, Italy, France and the Netherlands. They performed alongside the Fuzztones, the Creeps, the Stomachmouths, the Dizzy Satellites and others. In 1988, having replaced Nick "Pop Mind" with Panos Kasiaris on rhythm guitar, they released Heatwave, which was produced by Peter Zaremba of the Fleshtones. That was the album that brought them to the attention of  Music Maniac Records, a German label specializing in garage-rock releaseses, which re-released it with a new cover. This release brought them to Germany, where they participated in the Berlin Independence Days festival and also recorded the Time EP. 

By this time the sound of the group had started to somewhat change, becoming harder and speedier and moving towards stoner rock and neo-psychedelia, without however burning the bridges with its garage past. The band also caught the eye of Paul B. Cutler, of  Dream Syndicate fame, who would produce their next two records.

1990-1995
Their LP Blood Nirvana, released in 1990, marked the change in their sound, a fact that let down some of their hardcore garage fans and ended their cooperation with Music Maniac. At this time they were  considered a part of the "explosion" of the hard rock/indie Greek scene that took part during the early 1990s. Thus, they started becoming more popular among rock fans in Greece, and on the same year they were voted "band of the year" by the readers of the leading music magazine, Pop & Rock. They played as a support act  for the Wipers, The Jesus and Mary Chain, The Gun Club, and toured Germany with Dead Moon. In 1992 they released the F*head Entropy album, which is their most mature work.  Following a tour in Spain, the Last Drive celebrated their 10th anniversary with a live performance (pie fight included) at the "West Club" on December 23, 1993. In 1994, their contract with their long-time company, Hitch Hyke Records, ended. They signed for the multinational BMG Hellas and released Subliminal, an album in which songs followed a somewhat slower tempo than before. In 1995, Karanikolas left the band and moved to the United States. Some months later the Last Drive was disbanded, after twelve years on the road, having created a dedicated following in Greece and abroad, and an explosive live act.

1995-2007: Intermission
Yiorgos Karanikolas created the band Blackmail, who generally picked up from where the Drive had stopped, but with a greater emphasis on neo-psychedelia, and became quite popular at the time.

Alex Kalofolias and Thanos Amorginos created The Earthbound in 1998, a band with a completely different orientation around ethnic/Latin/desert rock. There have been rare instances in which The Earthbound were joined on stage by former Drive members. Kalofolias and Amorginos also co-wrote the music for Stratos Tzitzis' film Sose me (Save me). Amorginos also wrote music for theatrical plays.

Chris Michalatos played  with The Speedballs a rockabilly act, for a while.

2007-present
In early 2007, the band announced on their official website their reunion for some gigs. They performed live in Athens on May 11, 12 and 13th -all three dates being sold out- in Thessaloniki on the 19th and in Larissa on June 2.

Their first record ("Midnite Hop") was re-released by Greek DIY label Blind Bastard Records. They also played at the "Open Air Festival" in Athens on July 6. Finally, they were the headliners on the first day of the "Indie Rocket Festival 2007" (along with the Devastations, Acid Cobra and The Cesarians) that took place in Pescara, Italy on June 22 . In May 2008 the band did another Greek tour, while a live CD-DVD covering their reunion shows in Athens was released by Blind Bastard Records. In the same year a film documentary was released entitled "20000 Miles Ahead: A Last Drive Story" covering their story till the reunion gigs. In May 2009, a new CD came out entitled "Heavy Liquid". In September 2009 Inner Ear released it as a limited edition LP (500 black vinyls and 500 red vinyls). In April 2010 an art and comics anthology came out, entitled "At The Drive Ink" with artwork by 31 Greek artists inspired by the songs of "Heavy Liquid". In October 2010 the band contributed the track "Love & Terror" to the CD/booklet "Horror & Romance", a compilation of songs and music inspired by Stefanos Rokos' art exhibition. In June 2012 the band released a new EP called "News from Nowhere" and shortly after the guitar player Thanos Amorginos was replaced by Stefanos Flotsios. Since their reunion they tour Greece every year.

Members
Alexis Kalofolias (Alex K.) - ripper bass, vocals
Yiorgos Karanikolas (B.George Bop) - lead guitar, vocals
Christos Michalatos (Chris B.I.) - drums
Stefanos Flotsios - guitar
ex-members
Nikos Kapetanopoulos (Nick "Pop Mind") - guitar
Panos Kasiaris (P.PEP) - guitar
Thanos Amorginos (T.H. Lime) - guitar

Discography

In Greece 
Singles/EPs
Midnite Hop (7", Art Nouveau 1985)
I Was A Teenage Zombie (with the Fleshtones as "The Pleasure Hustlers") (Time Bomb: The Fleshtones present the Big Bang Theory, Hitch Hyke 1989)
Time (12" EP, Hitch Hyke 1989)
Overloaded (7" single sided promo, Hitch Hyke 1991)
News From Nowhere (12'ep, Happy Crasher Records / Inner Ear, 2012)

LPs
Underworld Shakedown (Hitch Hyke 1986)
Heatwave (Hitch Hyke 1988)
Blood Nirvana (Hitch Hyke 1990)
F*Head Entropy (Hitch Hyke 1992)
Subliminal (BMG 1994)
The Bad Roads | The Best Of The Last Drive (Columbia 2007)
Time Is Not Important (Live DVD-CD [shot and recorded at their 2007 reunion shows @ Athens], Blind Bastard Records 2008 )
Heavy Liquid (Happy Crasher Records 2009)
The Last Drive (The Lab/Labyrinth of Thoughts, 2018)

Contribs
(Live sto Kyttaro, Dikaioma Diavasis 1985)
May This Bullet (The Thing From Another World Volume 1, The Thing magazine 1995)
Chain Train; Gone Gone Gone (Rock Fm - Rodon:Live, Music Box 1991 (LP)/2000 (CD))
Jailbird; Outlaw (Local Heroes '95 Comp., Pop & Rock mag.)
Love & Terror ("Horror & Romance" Compilation, 2010)

Abroad
Singles/EPs
Blue Moon / Every Night / Sidewalk Stroll (7", Voxx 1987)

LPs
Heatwave (LP, Music Maniac 1988)
Their Story So Far (Underworld Shakedown + Heatwave) (CD, Music Maniac 1989)
Blood Nirvana (Romilar D 1991)
Blood Nirvana (LP/CD, Music Maniac 1991)
Blood Nirvana (CD, Restless 1992, bonus "Time Has Come Today" alternative mix)
 
Contribs
Every Night (Battle of the Garages Vol. 4, Voxx 1986)
Valley of Death (The sounds of now, Dionysus 1986)
I love Cindy (The secret team, Voxx 1988)
Hell to pay (Music Maniac Gimmick Comp., 1989)
Black Limo (The monster dance hall favorites vol. 3, Munster 1990)
Overloaded (It's a Restless World, Restless 1991)
The End Inc. (Larsen/Zine Comp. 1993)
Outlaw (Enclosed Please Find... Your Invitation To Suicide: A Tribute to the Songs of Martin Rev & Alan Vega Double LP, Munster 1994)

References
 Merlin's Music Box Greek music magazine, various issues (No. 5, No. 15, No. 25)
Article at Roadhouse.gr Music Portal photos and an interview from 1986  The Thing fanzine vol. 8, 1994 (discography)Pop & Rock magazine # 195 (1995), # 190
 ΟΖ musical newspaper'', issues 1993-1994

External links

Last Drive official website
Last Drive on Myspace
Myspace fan club of The Last Drive
Fan site of The Last Drive
Mini site at Music Maniac Records
Two audio interviews for a radio station in Arta, Greece (Greek).
Article by Dimitris Dimitrakas at In Rock fanzine (Greek).
Their first online interview, after their comeback at mic.gr (Greek)

Greek alternative rock groups
Musical groups established in 1983
Musical groups disestablished in 1995